El Llano is a corregimiento in Chepo District, Panamá Province, Panama with a population of 2,819 as of 2010. Its population as of 1990 was 12,393; its population as of 2000 was 2,839.

References

Corregimientos of Panamá Province